Chaetomyces is a genus of fungi in the family Laboulbeniaceae.

References

External links
Chaetomyces at Index Fungorum

Laboulbeniomycetes genera